John Shakespeare ( 1531 – 7 September 1601) was an English businessman in Stratford-upon-Avon and the father of William Shakespeare.  He was a glover and whittawer (leather worker) by trade. Shakespeare  was elected to several municipal offices, serving as an alderman and culminating in a term as bailiff, the chief magistrate of the town council, and mayor of Stratford in 1568, before he fell on hard times for reasons unknown. His fortunes later revived and he was granted a coat of arms five years before his death, probably at the instigation and expense of his son, the actor and playwright.

He married Mary Arden, with whom he had eight children, five of whom survived into adulthood.

Career and municipal responsibilities 
He was the son of Richard Shakespeare of the Warwickshire village of Snitterfield, a farmer.

John Shakespeare moved to Stratford-upon-Avon in 1551, where he became a successful businessman involved in several related occupations. At this time, Stratford had a population of 1500 people and only 200 houses. From 1556 to 1592, several official records identify him as a glovemaker, which was probably his primary trade, as tradition remembers him as following that trade even into his old age, but the records of his real estate purchases and legal expenses indicate an income much higher than that of a small-town tradesman. The administration of his father's estate in 1561 names him as a farmer. He inherited and leased agricultural lands and is on record as selling timber and barley. Court records also document him as a "brogger", an unlicensed—and therefore illegal—wool dealer. In addition, he bought and leased out houses. He was twice taken to court for violating the usury laws that prohibited charging interest higher than the legal limit of 10 per cent.

By 1552 he was residing in a house on Henley Street. On 2 October 1556, he purchased a house on the same street, the eastern wing of what is now called Shakespeare's Birthplace. Whether the house he bought in 1556 was the same house he had lived in during 1552 is unknown. In 1576, he bought two houses to the west and joined the three together.

In 1556, Shakespeare was elected borough ale taster, the first of several key municipal positions he was to hold in Stratford. In that position he was responsible for ensuring that weights and measures and prices were observed by innkeepers and publicans within the borough, and also by butchers, bakers and town traders. In 1558 he was appointed borough constable – a position similar to an early police constable. In 1559 he became an affeeror, an officer responsible for assessing fines for offences carrying penalties not explicitly defined by existing statutes. This role led to his becoming a burgess, then a chamberlain. He would have been known as a 'Goodman', a title that recognised his growing social status within Stratford. By 1564, Shakespeare was an alderman, a member of the Common Hall of Stratford, and it was in this year that William was born.

In 1568, Shakespeare was appointed High Bailiff, the present-day equivalent of mayor, elected by the common council of burgesses and aldermen, which entitled him to be referred to as Master John Shakespeare. In that capacity he presided at the sessions of the Court of Record and at council meetings. For his borough the bailiff was almoner, coroner, escheator, and clerk of the market, and served as justice of the peace issuing warrants and negotiating with the lord of the manor on behalf of the corporation.

In 1569, Shakespeare had applied for a coat of arms; the application—subsequently withdrawn—included a vague claim of an ancestor having been honoured by King Henry VII, a draft of which application (with parenthetical additions representing amendments to be made in a successive draft) read: "John Shakespeare ... whose parentes and late antecessors [grandfather] were for there [his] valeant and faithefull service advaunced and rewarded by the most prudent prince king Henry the Seventh of famous memorie, sythence whiche tyme they have continewed ... in good reputation and credit ...". After a long period of dormancy, arms were granted by William Dethick of the College of Arms on 20 October 1596. Most historians believe that his son, William, re-opened the application following his literary and financial success in London. This application additionally made reference to John Shakespeare having married "the daughter and heir of Arden, a gentleman of worship".

Marriage into the local gentry

He married Mary Arden, one of the Ardens of Warwickshire, a local gentry family and reportedly a niece of John Shakespeare's father Richard Shakespeare. It is not known when they married, but a date around 1557 is assumed as there is a baptismal record for a "Joan Shakespeare, daughter to John Shakespeare" dated 15 September 1558.

The Shakespeares had eight children:
Joan (baptised 15 September 1558, died in infancy),
Margaret (bap. 2 December 1562buried 30 April 1563),
William (bap. 26 April 156423 April 1616),
Gilbert (bap. 13 October 1566bur. 2 February 1612),
Joan (bap. 15 April 1569bur. 4 November 1646),
Anne (bap. 28 September 1571bur. 4 April 1579),
Richard (bap. 11 March 1574bur. 4 February 1613) and
Edmund (bap. 3 May 1580bur. London, 31 December 1607).

Risk taking and financial problems
Shakespeare fell on hard times in the late 1570s that would last until the early 1590s. He failed to attend council meetings, attending just once (on 5 September 1582) between January 1577 and 6 September 1586 when he lost his position as an alderman for non-attendance. In 1592, he was recorded as among several local men who stayed away from Church services for fear of being arrested for debt. Records indicate that he was also prosecuted in the 1570s for usury and for illegal dealing in wool. Such illicit trade would have been profitable to his glove business by avoiding the middleman. In 1570, he was accused of making loans to a Walter Mussum, worth £220 (equivalent to over £50,000 in 2007), including interest. Mussum was not a good risk; at his death, his whole estate was worth £114, or barely half what Shakespeare had lent him. The financial risk was just one side of his potentially problematic business activity. The law described usury as "a vice most odious and detestable" and levied severe penalties for those caught in such practices, even in a small way. The law stated that anyone caught lending money with interest illegally would forfeit all the money lent, plus forfeiture of any interest due, face a fine on top and also possible imprisonment. He was also engaged in trading wool illegally in 1571, when he acquired 300 tods (or ) of wool, a large consignment.

In 1576, Shakespeare withdrew from public life in Stratford. He had been excused levies that he was supposed to pay by supportive townsmen and business associates and they kept his name on the rolls for a decade, perhaps hoping that in that time he would be able to return to public life and recover his financial situation, but he never did so. He is mentioned in the local records in 1597 when he sold some property to George Badger, a draper.

John Shakespeare was buried on 8 September 1601 at Holy Trinity Church, Stratford.

Personality and religious beliefs

The only record that survives of Shakespeare's personality is a note written by Thomas Plume fifty years after his death. Plume records a conversation with Sir John Mennes (1599–1671), who stated that he had once met him in his shop and described him as a "merry cheeked old man" who said of his son that "Will was a good honest fellow, but he durst have cracked a jest with him at any time." As Katherine Duncan-Jones points out, this is impossible, since Mennes was two years old when John Shakespeare died. She thinks Plume may have been recording an anecdote related by Mennes taken from his father.

Shakespeare and his immediate family were conforming members of the established Church of England. John Shakespeare was elected to several municipal offices, which required being a church member in good standing. William Shakespeare's baptism and that of his siblings were entered into the parish church register, as were the burials of family members. Shakespeare, acting as town chamberlain and in accordance with Elizabeth I's injunction of 1559 to remove "all signs of superstition and idolatry from places of worship", covered over the wall-paintings of the Chapel of the Guild of the Holy Cross some time in the 1560s or 1570s; his contemporary record detailed paying two shillings for "defasyng ymages in ye chapel".

However, some scholars believe there is evidence that several members of Shakespeare's family were secretly recusant Roman Catholics. Mary Arden was from a Catholic family. A tract, apparently signed by John Shakespeare, in which he pledged to remain a Catholic in his heart, was found in the 18th century in the rafters of a house on Henley Street. It was seen and described by scholar Edmond Malone but apparently was subsequently lost.  Anthony Holden writes that Malone's reported wording of the tract is linked to a testament written by Charles Borromeo and circulated in England by Edmund Campion, copies of which still exist in Italian and English. Other research suggests the Borromeo testament dated from 1638 at the earliest and could never have been in the possession of John Shakespeare. The first leaf of the document had been forged by John Jordan who acquired the manuscript and attempted to have it published.

Footnotes

References

 
 
 
 
 
 
 
 .

External links
 A Shakespeare Genealogy

1530s births
1601 deaths
16th-century English people
17th-century English people
Councillors in Warwickshire
People from Stratford-upon-Avon
Shakespeare family